Nieznany (Unknown) is a 1964 Polish film, directed by Witold Lesiewicz. A war film set in a Soviet labour camp. The action of the film takes place in 1943. Two Poles escape from the Soviet labor camp. Their goal is to get to the Polish Army in position over the Oka River. Following the Battle of Lenino, they finally reach Poland.

See also
List of World War II films (1950–1989)

External links

Nieznany at filmpolski 

1964 films
Polish World War II films
Polish war drama films
Films directed by Witold Lesiewicz
Films about Polish resistance during World War II